Hasora, the awls, are a genus of skipper butterflies. Hasora species are found in the Indomalayan and Australasian realms.

Species
 Hasora alta de Jong, 1982 Sumatra
 Hasora anura - slate awl
 Hasora anura taiwana Hsu, Tsukiyama & Chiba, 2005 Taiwan
 Hasora badra - common awl
 Hasora borneensis Elwes & Edwards, 1897 Borneo
 Hasora buina Evans, 1926 Solomon Islands (Bougainville, Vella Lavella).
 Hasora celaenus (Stoll, [1782]) Maluku Islands, New Guinea
 Hasora coeruleostriata De Jong, 1982 Philippines
 Hasora chromus - common banded awl Cramer, 1780
 H. c. chromus Cramer, 1780
 Hasora danda Evans, 1949 Burma, Thailand, Laos, North Vietnam, West China
 Hasora fushigina Maruyama & Ueda, 1992
 Hasora lavella Evans, 1928 Solomon Islands (Bougainville, Vella Lavella).
 Hasora leucospila (Mabille, 1891)
 Hasora lizetta (Plötz, [1883]) Malaya, Java
 Hasora mavis Evans, 1934 Thailand, Malay Peninsula, Talaud, Philippines
 Hasora mixta (Mabille, 1876)
 H. m. mixta Luzon
 H. m. simplicissima (Mabille, 1876) Moluccas
 H. m. cirta Fruhstorfer, 1911 Bazilan
 H. m. prabha Fruhstorfer, 1911 Palawan
 H. m. lioneli Fruhstorfer, 1911 Sumatra
 H. m. yanuna Fruhstorfer, 1911 Nias
 H. m. tyrius Fruhstorfer, 1911 West Java
 H. m. fenestrata Fruhstorfer, 1911 Sulawesi, Sangihe, Wowoni, Banggai, Sula
 Hasora moestissima (Mabille, 1876)  Celebes
 Hasora mus Elwes & Edwards, 1897 Malaya
 Hasora myra (Hewitson, [1867]) Thailand, Malay Peninsula
 Hasora perplexa (Mabille, 1876)  Moluccas
 Hasora proximata (Staudinger, 1889) Palawan
 Hasora proxissima Elwes & Edwards, 1897 Mindoro
 H. p. chalybeia Inoue & Kawazoe, 1964 Vietnam
 H. p. siamica Evans, 1932 Thailand, Laos
 H. p. siva Evans, 1932 Borneo
 Hasora quadripunctata (Mabille, 1876) Moluccas
 Hasora saida  (Hewitson, 1867)  Philippines
 Hasora sakit Maruyama & Ueda, 1992
 Hasora salanga (Plötz, 1885)
 Hasora schoenherr
 Hasora simillima Rothschild, 1916 Kapaur
 Hasora subcaelestis Rothschild, 1916  New Guinea
 Hasora takwa Evans, 1949 New Guinea
 Hasora taminatus - white-banded awl
 H. t. vairacana Fruhstorfer, 1911
 Hasora thridas (Boisduval, 1832) New Guinea
 Hasora umbrina (Mabille, 1891) Vanuatu
 Hasora vitta - plain banded awl
 Hasora wilcocksi Eliot, 1970 Tioman
 Hasora zoma Evans, 1934 Thailand, Malay Peninsula, Sumatra

 Australian species
 Hasora discolor - green awl C&R Felder, 1859
 H. d. mastusia Fruhstorfer
 Hasora khoda -  large banded awl Mabille, 1876
 H. k. haslia Swinhoe
 Hasora hurama - broad-banded awl Butler, 1870

External links
Images representing Hasora at BOLD
Funet taxonomy, distribution

 
Coeliadinae
Butterflies of Indochina
Hesperiidae genera
Taxa named by Frederic Moore